Truxton Trust, a full-service private bank and wealth management company founded in 2004 provides wealth management, private banking, business banking, and treasury management services.  Truxton Trust wealth management services manages accounts for high net worth individuals and organizations including investment accounts, retirement accounts, trust, foundations, and estates. Truxton Trust banking services include commercial and residential, long-term and short-term mortgages, and other secured and unsecured personal and business lending, in addition to providing online banking services for both business as well as personal checking and savings accounts, Truxton Trust also provides remote deposit, ACH services, Xpress deposit, online bill payments, and other treasury management services for businesses and individuals.

Truxton Trust is based in the Belle Meade area of Nashville, Tennessee, with a wealth management office in Athens, Georgia.

Truxton Trust Company operates as a subsidiary of Truxton Corporation.

History
In 2003, Truxton Trust was organized as a private bank and trust company, to serve the financial needs of high net worth individuals, their families and business interests. Truxton Trust, then Nashville Bank and Trust, opened for business in August 2004, after raising initial capital of $20 million. In 2013, the name was changed name to Truxton Trust.

Truxton Trust was named by American Banker as a 40th Top Bank in the US in 2017, making the list for a 5th consecutive year.

References

External links
Official Website

Companies based in Nashville, Tennessee
Banks based in Tennessee
2004 establishments in Tennessee
Banks established in 2004